Bel Air Rivière Sèche, more often referred to simply as Bel Air, is a village in the Flacq district of Mauritius. The village is administered by the Bel Air Rivière Sèche Village Council under the aegis of the Flacq District Council. According to the census made by Statistics Mauritius in 2011, the population was at 17,605.

See also 
 Districts of Mauritius
 List of places in Mauritius

References 

Populated places in Mauritius
Flacq District